The sacral spinal nerve 3 (S3) is a spinal nerve of the sacral segment.

It originates from the spinal column from below the 3rd body of the sacrum.

Muscles
S3 supplies many muscles, either directly or through nerves originating from S3. They are not innervated with S3 as single origin, but partly by S3 and partly by other spinal nerves. The muscles are:
 iliococcygeus
 puborectalis
 coccygeus
 sphincter urethrae membranaceae
 superior gemellus

Additional Images

References

Spinal nerves